The longsnouted catfish (Plicofollis argyropleuron), also known as the Broadbent's catfish, the spoon-nosed catfish, the large-scaled catfish, the sharp-headed catfish, or the sand catfish, is a species of catfish in the family Ariidae. It was described by Achille Valenciennes in 1840, originally under the genus Arius. It inhabits brackish and marine waters in New Guinea, Australia, and southern and southeastern Asia.

The diet of the longsnouted catfish includes bony fish, benthic crustaceans including crabs and prawns, detritus, mollusks, polychaete and annelid worms, algae and mud.

References

Ariidae
Fish described in 1840